Pohjois-Espoo (Finnish) or Norra Esbo (Swedish) is a north main district of Espoo, a city in Finland.

It contains the districts Bodom, Kalajärvi, Lahnus, Lakisto, Luukki, Niipperi, Perusmäki, Röylä, Vanhakartano and Velskola.

See also 
 Districts of Espoo

Districts of Espoo